Caecoparvus is a genus of ground beetles in the family Carabidae. There are more than 20 described species in Caecoparvus.

Species
These 23 species belong to the genus Caecoparvus:

 Caecoparvus achaiae Giachino & Vailati, 2011
 Caecoparvus anatolicus (Jedlicka, 1968)
 Caecoparvus arcadicus (G.Müller, 1935)
 Caecoparvus assingi Giachino & Vailati, 2019
 Caecoparvus berrutii Giachino & Vailati, 2011
 Caecoparvus bialookii Giachino & Vailati, 2019
 Caecoparvus brachati Giachino & Vailati, 2019
 Caecoparvus daccordii Giachino & Vailati, 2011
 Caecoparvus hercules Giachino & Vailati, 2011
 Caecoparvus karavae Giachino & Vailati, 2011
 Caecoparvus leonidae Giachino & Vailati, 2011
 Caecoparvus lompei Giachino & Vailati, 2011
 Caecoparvus lydiae Giachino & Vailati, 2019
 Caecoparvus marchesii Giachino & Vailati, 2011
 Caecoparvus meschniggi (Winkler, 1936)
 Caecoparvus meybohmi Giachino & Vailati, 2019
 Caecoparvus muelleri (Ganglbauer, 1900)
 Caecoparvus parnassicus (Breit, 1923)
 Caecoparvus pavesii Giachino & Vailati, 2011
 Caecoparvus sciakyi Giachino & Vailati, 2011
 Caecoparvus tauricus Giachino & Vailati, 2019
 Caecoparvus tokatensis (Vigna Taglianti, 1976)
 Caecoparvus vavrai Giachino & Vailati, 2019

References

Trechinae